"Treasure of Love" is a song written by Joe Shapiro and Lou Stallman and performed by Clyde McPhatter and the Drifters. It was featured on their 1956 album Clyde McPhatter & The Drifters. "Treasure of Love" reached No. 1 on the U.S. R&B chart, No. 16 on the U.S. pop chart.   Overseas, the song went to No. 27 on the UK Singles Chart.

Cover versions
 Dorothy Collins released a cover version of the song as a single in 1956, but it did not chart. It was arranged by Dick Jacobs.
 Pat Boone released a version of the song on his 1957 EP "Pat" on Mike.
 Tommy Steele released a version of the song on his 1957 album Tommy Steele Stage Show.
 Johnny Burnette released a version of the song on his 1961 album Johnny Burnette Sings.
 Ruth Brown released a version of the song on her 1962 album Along Came Ruth. It was arranged by Jerry Kennedy.
 Jill Jackson released a version of the song as a single in 1965, but it did not chart. It was produced by Jimmy Bowen and arranged by Bill Justis.
 B. J. Thomas released a version of the song as a single in 1966, but it did not chart.
 Ronnie Hawkins released a version of the song on his 1971 album The Hawk. It was produced by Tom Dowd.
  John Holt released a version of the song on his 1972 album Pledging My Love.
 Mel Carter released a version of the song as a single in 1973, but it did not chart. It was produced by Bob Marcucci.
 Cliff Richard and the London Philharmonic Orchestra released a version of the song on their 1983 album Dressed for the Occasion. It was produced by Richard Anthony Hewson and Richard and arranged by Hewson.
 The Persuasions released a version of the song on their 1984 album No Frills.
 Dion released a version of the song on his 1986 album Velvet and Steel.

References 

1956 songs
1956 singles
1965 singles
1966 singles
1973 singles
Clyde McPhatter songs
The Drifters songs
Pat Boone songs
Johnny Burnette songs
Ruth Brown songs
Mel Carter songs
Dion DiMucci songs
B. J. Thomas songs
Song recordings produced by Jimmy Bowen
Song recordings produced by Tom Dowd
Atlantic Records singles
Coral Records singles
Reprise Records singles
Songs written by Lou Stallman